Serafimovka is a rural locality (a selo) in Tuymazinsky District, Bashkortostan, Russia. The population was 209 as of 2010. There are 3 streets.

Geography 
Serafimovka is located 25 km southeast of Tuymazy (the district's administrative centre) by road. Serafimovsky is the nearest rural locality.

References 

Rural localities in Tuymazinsky District